The following lists events that happened during 1924 in the Kingdom of Serbs, Croats and Slovenes.

Incumbents
 King: Alexander I
 Prime Minister: 
 until 28 July: Nikola Pašić
 28 July-6 November: Ljubomir Davidović
 starting 6 November: Nikola Pašić

Events

January
 January 2 – The Bulgarian government gave former King Ferdinand, who had been living in exile since 1918, permission to return to Sofia while Yugoslavia immediately sends an ultimatum objecting to the move.
 January 4 – Yugoslavia sends another sharp note to Bulgaria saying it would not accept the return of Ferdinand from exile or any further provocations. Newspapers in Belgrade clamored for war.

References

 
Yugoslavia
1920s in Yugoslavia
Years of the 20th century in Yugoslavia
Yugoslavia